Acromacer is a genus of pine flower snout beetles in the family Nemonychidae. There is one described species in Acromacer, A. bombifrons.

References

Further reading

 
 

Polyphaga
Articles created by Qbugbot